Чёрный Кофе (Chorny Kofe, Russian for "black coffee") is a Russian heavy metal band active since 1981. It is led by guitarist and singer Dmitry Varshavsky.

The band features in volume 5 of the Legends of Russian Rock anthology published by Moroz Records.

Members
Current
Dmitry Warsaw - vocals, guitar (1979–present)
Eugene Warsaw - bass guitar (2015–present)
Andrew Prefix - drums (2009–present)

Former
Paul Rizhenkov - bass guitar (1979-1981)
Mikhail Shevtsov - keyboards (1979-1986)
Alexey Korobkov - drums (1981-1982)
Fyodor Vasilyev - bass guitar (1981-1986, 1990-1991, 1998-2002)
Andrew Shatunovskii - drums (1984, 1986, 1990)
Yuri Causeway - bass guitar (1984)
Sergey Mavrin - guitar (1985-1986)
Maxim Oudalov - drums (1985-1986)
Andrew Hirnyk - bass guitar (1986) †
Alexander Bondarenko - drums (1986)
Andrei Rodin - drums (1986)
Sergey Chernyakov - drums (1986-1988) †
Igor Kupriyanov - bass guitar, vocals (1986-1990)
Stas Bartenёv - Guitar (1987)
Sergey Kudishin - rhythm guitar (1987, 1988)
Igor Andreev - rhythm guitar (1987-1988)
Andrew Peppers - drums (1988-1992) †
Boris Dolgikh - keyboards (1989, 1996)
Dmitry Gorbatikov - Guitar (1990)
Konstantin Veretennikov - guitar (1991-1992, 1999)
Pavel Markin - drums (1994-1995)
Alexander Bach - drums (1996)
Anatoly Abramov - drums (1998-2000, 2002-2007)
Paul Smeyan - keyboards, bass guitar (1998-2008) †
Sergey Efimov - drums (2000)
Sergey Dorovskoi - rhythm guitar (2000-2001)
Sergey Pochitalov - drums (2000-2002)
Yuri Mahin - bass guitar (2002-2005)
Ivan Mikhailov - bass guitar (2006-2008)
Nikolai Large - bass guitar (2008-2013)
Dmitry Zawidow - drums (2007-2008)
Alexander Karpuhin - drums (2008)
Svyatoslav Chernuha - drums (2008-2009)
Vyacheslav Yadrikov - bass guitar (2010)
Lev Gorbachev - bass guitar (2013-2015)
Alexey Fetisov - bass guitar (2014)
Denis Ovchinnikov - bass guitar (2016)

Discography
 1984 — "Pridi I Vse Vozmi" (Приди и всё возьми; Come And Take Everything)
 1985 — "Sladky Angel" (Сладкий ангел; Sweet Angel) - DEMO Album
 1984/1986 — "Svertliy Metall" (Светлый металл; Bright Metal)
 1987 — "Cherniy Kofe" (Чёрный кофе; Black Coffee) - DEMO Album
 1987 — "Perestupi Porog" (Переступи порог; Step Over the Threshold)
 1989 — "Vol'nomu-Volya" (Вольному — воля; Freedom for the Free)
 1991 — "Golden Lady"
 1992 — "Lady Osen'" (Леди Осень; Lady Autumn)
 1996 — "Pyanaya Luna" (Пьяная луна; Drunk Moon)
 2002 — "Beliy Veter" (Белый ветер; White Wind)
 2004 — "Oni Besi" (Они бесы; They are Demons)
 2007 — "Александрия" (Alexandria)
 2009 — "Putevka V Ad" (Путёвка в Ад; Voucher to hell)
 2013 — "Chest i Vernost" (Честь и Верность; Honour and Fidelity )
 2013 — "Osennij Albom" (Осенний альбом; Autumn Album)

External links
 Official site  (includes video and audio downloads)
 Black coffee in Encyclopaedia Metallum
 BLACK COFFEE
 Facebook
 

Musical groups established in 1981
Russian heavy metal musical groups
Christian metal musical groups
Soviet heavy metal musical groups